Astrum Online Entertainment is a Russian holding company which operates in the online entertainment market of Eastern Europe. Founded in the beginning of December 2007, it incorporated four companies, which specialize in development, publishing and operating online games: Nival Online, IT Territory, Time Zero, and Nikita Online. In summer 2008 the fifth company, the developer of online games called "DJ Games", joined in.

The move will allow the participants to formalize a united strategy in regards to their activities and also utilize their combined experience and infrastructure in order to perfect their businesses.

According to the experts, the 2008 revenues of Astrum Online were estimated at US$50 million.

Astrum Online currently operates more than 30 MMO games, including such popular titles as "Legend: Legacy of the Dragons", "Sphere", "Territory", "Three Kingdoms", and "Perfect World".

History
Astrum Online was founded in December 2007. Joint forces of the companies let to launch several major gaming projects in Russia and abroad and to support dynamic domestic growth of existing titles in 2008.

The end of 2008 and the very beginning of 2009 were marked with official launches of MMO game "Legend: Legacy of the Dragons" in Germany and Turkey by Astrum GmbH (Astrum's representative office in Europe) and in China in partnership with Snail Game. Previously MMORPG TimeZero was launched in Germany.

Key people
Igor Matsanyuk, President
Boris Gertsovskiy, Vice President
Alisa Chumachenko, Vice President of Marketing and Advertising
Vsevolod Leonov, Vice President of Business Development
Anatoly Ropotov, EVP of Products
Robert Johnsson, Chief Executive Officer Astrum Online Europe GmbH

Subsidiaries
 Time Zero
 Nikita Online
 Nival Online
 DJ Games

Game titles (as of March 2009)
Allods Online
Legend: Legacy of the Dragons
Perfect World
Slapshot

Internet portals (as of March 2009)
 Games.mail.ru
 Woh.ru
 Astrumo.de

Payment system
 Terrabank
 Webmoney

External links

 Astrum Online's Official Web Site
 Allods Online Fansite & Forums
 Fr Fan Site

References

Entertainment companies of Russia
Companies based in Moscow
Russian brands